Jamné is a municipality and village in Jihlava District in the Vysočina Region of the Czech Republic. It has about 600 inhabitants.

Administrative parts
The village of Lipina is an administrative part of Jamné.

References

Villages in Jihlava District